Vampula Airfield is an airfield in Vampula, Huittinen, Finland, about  west-northwest of Vampula village.

See also
List of airports in Finland

References

External links 
 VFR Suomi/Finland – Vampula Airfield
 Lentopaikat.net – Vampula Airfield 

Airports in Finland
Vampula
Buildings and structures in Satakunta